Amaziah was an idolatrous priest of Bethel (Book of Amos 7:10–17), who lived during the reign of Jeroboam II. Amaziah forbade Amos to prophesy against Israel.

In Rabbinical Literature
According to R. Meir, the priest Amaziah is identical with the false prophet mentioned in I Kings, xiii. 11 et seq. (Yer. Sanh. xi. 30b and Cant. R. ii. 5).

References 

Book of Amos
Hebrew Bible people